CNC World is a majority state-owned 24-hour global English-language news channel, launched on July 1, 2010. It is 51% owned by the state-run China Xinhua News Network Corporation, and 49% by private investors, including Chinese home appliances maker Gree.

The venture is part of Beijing's effort to "present an international vision with a Chinese perspective," Xinhua President Li Congjun said at the press conference announcing the launch of CNC World.

Xinhua has leased a newsroom in New York on top of a skyscraper in Times Square to provide CNC World with prominent exposure in the United States. On December 16, 2010, CNC World agreed a deal with Eutelsat for coverage on Eutelsat 28A, 36B and Hot Bird 13B from January 1, 2011. CNC World launched on the Sky satellite television platform in the United Kingdom and Ireland on July 21, 2011, from Eutelsat 28A.

In 2020, the United States Department of State designated Xinhua, along with other Chinese state media outlets, as foreign missions. By 2021, the network's terrestrial television affiliates in the United States had all disaffiliated with the network.

References

External links 

 

Xinhua News Agency
English-language television stations
International broadcasters
Television channels and stations established in 2010
24-hour television news channels in China
Government-owned companies of China
State media